Hanna Paula Helena Werning is a Finnish politician currently serving in the Parliament of Finland for the Social Democratic Party of Finland at the South-Eastern Finland constituency.

References

1976 births
Living people
People from Mikkeli
Social Democratic Party of Finland politicians
Members of the Parliament of Finland (2019–23)
Women members of the Parliament of Finland
21st-century Finnish women politicians